Ovalle is a surname. Notable people with the surname include:

Adolfo Ovalle (born 1970), Chilean former footballer
Adolfo Ovalle (born 1997), Chilean footballer
Clemente Ovalle (born 1982), Mexican footballer
Federico Ovalle (born 1955), Mexican politician
Iñigo Manglano-Ovalle (born 1961), American artist
Jaime Ovalle (1894–1955), Brazilian composer and poet
José Tomás Ovalle (1787–1831), Chilean politician
Juan Ríos Ovalle (1863–1928), Puerto Rican musician and composer
Lizbeth Ovalle (born 1999), Mexican footballer
Luis Ovalle (born 1988), Panamanian footballer
Manuel Enrique Ovalle Araiza (born 1968), Mexican politician
Nicolas Ovalle (born 2000), Chilean footballer